The following highways are numbered 885:

United States
 Interstate 885 (proposed)
 Arkansas Highway 885
 County Road 885 (Lee County, Florida)
 Louisiana Highway 885 (former)
 Pennsylvania Route 885
 Farm to Market Road 885